This is a list of multilateral free-trade agreements, between several countries all treated equally. For agreements between two countries, between a bloc and a country, or between two blocs, see list of bilateral free-trade agreements; these are not listed below.

Every customs union, common market, economic union, customs and monetary union and economic and monetary union is also a free-trade area; these are listed on these separate articles and are not included below.

For a general explanation, see free-trade area.

World Trade Organization agreements

General Agreement on Tariffs and Trade of 1994
Agreement on Agriculture
Agreement on the Application of Sanitary and Phytosanitary Measures
Agreement on Technical Barriers to Trade
Agreement on Trade Related Investment Measures
Agreement on Anti-Dumping
Agreement on Customs Valuation
Agreement on Preshipment Inspection
Agreement on Rules of Origin
Agreement on Import Licensing Procedures
Agreement on Subsidies and Countervailing Measures
Agreement on Safeguards
Agreement on Trade Facilitation 
General Agreement on Trade in Services
Agreement on Trade-Related Aspects of Intellectual Property Rights
Dispute Settlement Understanding
Trade Policy Review Mechanism
Agreement on Trade in Civil Aircraft
Agreement on Government Procurement
Arrangement regarding Bovine Meat, this agreement was terminated end 1997. 
International Dairy Agreement, this agreement was terminated end 1997. 
Information Technology Agreement
Bali Package

Operating agreements

 African Continental Free Trade Area - 2019
 Andean Community - 1969
 ASEAN Free Trade Area (AFTA) - 1992
 ASEAN–Australia–New Zealand Free Trade Area (AANZFTA) - 2010
 Asia-Pacific Trade Agreement (APTA) - 1975
 Central American Integration System (SICA) - 1993
 Central European Free Trade Agreement (CEFTA) - 1992
 Common Market for Eastern and Southern Africa (COMESA) - 1994
 Commonwealth of Independent States Free Trade Area (CISFTA) - 2011
 Greater Arab Free Trade Area (GAFTA) - 1997
 Dominican Republic–Central America Free Trade Agreement (DR-CAFTA) - 2004
 East African Community (EAC) - 2005
 Economic Cooperation Organization Trade Agreement (ECOTA) - 2003
 Eurasian Economic Union (EAEU) - 2015
 European Economic Area (EEA; European Union–Norway–Iceland–Liechtenstein) - 1994
 European Free Trade Association (EFTA) - 1960
 European Union Customs Union (EUCU; European Union–Turkey–Monaco–San Marino–Andorra) - 1958
 G-3 Free Trade Agreement (G-3) - 1995
 Gulf Cooperation Council (GCC) - 1981
 International Grains Agreement - 1995 Comprising a Grains Trade Convention (GTC) and a Food Aid Convention (FAC)
 Organization of the Black Sea Economic Cooperation (BSEC) - 1992
 Pacific Alliance Free Trade Area (PAFTA) - 2012
 South Asian Free Trade Area (SAFTA) - 2004
 Southern African Development Community Free Trade Area (SADCFTA) - 1980
 Southern Common Market (MERCOSUR) - 1991
 Comprehensive and Progressive Agreement for Trans-Pacific Partnership (CPTPP) - 2018
 United States–Mexico–Canada Agreement (USMCA) - 2020
 Regional Comprehensive Economic Partnership (RCEP) - 2022

Proposed agreements

 African Free Trade Zone (AFTZ) between SADC, EAC and COMESA
 Arab Maghreb Union (UMA)
 Association of Caribbean States (ACS)
 Bay of Bengal Initiative for Multi-Sectoral Technical and Economic Cooperation (BIMSTEC)
 Canada, Australia, New Zealand and United Kingdom Union (CANZUK)
 China–Japan–South Korea Free Trade Agreement
 Community of Sahel-Saharan States (CEN-SAD)
 Commonwealth Free Trade Area (CFTA)
 Economic Community of Central African States (ECCAS)
 Economic Community of West African States (ECOWAS)
 Economic Partnership Agreements (EU-ACP)
 Euro-Mediterranean free trade area (EU-MEFTA)
 Free Trade Area of the Americas (FTAA)
 Free Trade Area of the Asia Pacific (FTAAP), proposed APEC FTA
 GUAM Organization for Democracy and Economic Development (GUAM)
 Intergovernmental Authority on Development (IGAD)
 Open Balkan
 Pacific Agreement on Closer Economic Relations (PACER and PACER Plus)
 2021 Pacific Island Countries Trade Agreement (PICTA)
 Shanghai Cooperation Organisation (SCO)
 Transatlantic Free Trade Area (TAFTA)
 Tripartite Free Trade Area (T-FTA)
 Union of South American Nations (USAN)

Agreements no longer active
Association of Iron Ore Exporting Countries [APEF] - 1974
Caribbean Free Trade Association [CARIFTA] - 1968 
International Bauxite Association [IBA] - 1974
International Tin Agreement - 1956
Multi Fibre Arrangement - 1974
North American Free Trade Agreement (NAFTA) - 1994

Agreements signed but never in effect
 Trans-Pacific Partnership (TPP) - signed 2016, signature withdrawn by the United States in 2017 thus rendering the agreement unratifiable.

See also

 Free trade areas in Europe (with maps)
 List of bilateral free-trade agreements
 List of country groupings

References

External links
 bilaterals.org - "Everything that's not happening at the WTO"
 fightingftas.org
 FTAs submitted to the WTO
 World Bank's PTA database to search and compare
 Americas FTAs
 EU FTAs
 EU-ACP countries Economic Partnership Agreements (EPA) Negotiations: Where do we stand?
 Singapore official FTA site
 EFTA official site
 Australia official FTA site
 Bilateral and Regional Trade Agreements Notified to the WTO: developed by WorldTradeLaw.net and Bryan Mercurio
 ptas.mcgill.ca
 TREND-Analytics website - Interactive list of bilateral and multilateral free trade instruments

International trade-related lists
Free trade treaties
 
Globalization-related lists